The 6th Infantry Division is an infantry division of the Philippine Army. Popularly known as the Kampilan Division, the 6th Infantry Division is one of the Philippine Army's infantry units in Central Mindanao.

History
The division was established on October 24, 1987, by the Armed Forces of the Philippines, with Brig. General Gonzalo H. Siongco as the first Commanding General assigned in its headquarters in Awang, Datu Odin Sinsuat, Maguindanao.

Current Units

The following are the Brigades under the 6th Infantry Division:
 601st Infantry "Unifier" Brigade
 602nd Infantry "Liberator" Brigade
 603rd Infantry "Persuader" Brigade

The following are the Battalions under the 6th Infantry Division:
  6th Infantry Battalion
  7th Infantry "Tapat" Battalion
 33rd Infantry "Makabayan" Battalion
 37th Infantry "Conqueror" Battalion
 40th Infantry "Magiting" Battalion
 57th Infantry "Masikap" Battalion
 90th Infantry Battalion
 64th Division Reconnaissance Company
  6th Field Artillery Battalion

The following units are the OPCON under the 6th Infantry Division:
 1 Mechanized “Lakan” Infantry Battalion
 5 Special Forces Battalion

The following are the support units under the 6th Infantry Division:
  6th Signal Battalion
  6th CMO Battalion
  Service Support Battalion
  6th Division Training School
  6th Division Training Unit

Operations
 Anti-guerrilla operations against the New People's Army, and MILF.
 Counter-terrorism operations against the ASG and the JI.
 Operation Darkhorse

References

Infantry divisions of the Philippines
Military units and formations established in 1987